Big Break was an American talent contest television show hosted by singer Natalie Cole. The weekly one-hour program featured singers and musicians competing for a $100,000 prize with guest appearances. Winners from each week competed in the semi-finals and then the final; voting was done by the studio audience. R&B singer-songwriter and Record producer R. Kelly won the prize before his stardom as a member of the group MGM (Mentally Gifted Men). The show lasted for one season.

Celebrity guests who appeared on the show include Whitney Houston, Patti LaBelle, Bill Cosby, M.C. Hammer, Michael McDonald, and Regina Belle.

References

External links 

1990s American music television series
1990 American television series debuts
1991 American television series endings
English-language television shows
Fox Broadcasting Company original programming
Music competitions in the United States